Sutterella parvirubra is a Gram-negative, oxidase- and catalase-negative, anaerobic, non-spore-forming, nonmotile bacterium from the genus  Sutterella in the family Sutterellaceae, which was isolated from human faeces.

References

External links
Type strain of Sutterella parvirubra at BacDive -  the Bacterial Diversity Metadatabase

Burkholderiales
Bacteria described in 2008